Boolean algebra is the algebra of truth values and operations on them.

Boolean algebra may also refer to:

 Boolean algebra (structure), any member of a certain class of mathematical structures that can be described in terms of an ordering or in terms of operations on a set
 Two-element Boolean algebra,  Boolean algebra whose underlying set has two elements
 Boolean ring

See also
 Boolean (disambiguation)